The A354 is a primary route in England which runs from Salisbury in Wiltshire to Easton on the Isle of Portland in Dorset, a total distance of . From Salisbury the road crosses Cranborne Chase. At Woodyates the road follows the route of Ackling Dyke, a Roman Road for a short distance. The A354 briefly merges with the A350 at the Blandford Forum bypass before crossing the Dorset Downs and merging with the A35 at the Puddletown bypass.  to the west it splits from the Dorchester bypass and runs south. The road now bypasses Upwey and Broadwey on a new section of road which has some two lane sections going north and one lane continuously going south towards Weymouth. After the old and new sections meet at Manor Roundabout the road follows down Weymouth Way alongside Radipole Lake. The final stretch runs across a short bridge over Chesil beach onto Portland. Historically the section between Dorchester and Fortuneswell was part of the A37 with the extension to Easton being the original B3154. This section of the A37 became part of the A354 in 1935 but the B3154 was only renumbered as part of the A354 in the 1980s.

Weymouth Relief Road
The project was to build a  single carriageway road, with crawler lane along part, linking the A354 Manor Roundabout near Radipole to the A354 at the top of the Ridgeway Hill.
The main carriageway of the Weymouth Relief Road opened on Thursday 17 March 2011.

The 2012 Olympics at Portland played a major factor in making £89m funding for the road available.

The History of Improving the A354 Dorchester Road

References

External links

Dorset for you – Weymouth Relief Road

Roads in England
Roads in Dorset
Roads in Wiltshire